Alan Francis Bright Rogers (1907–2003) was an Anglican bishop who held three different posts in an ecclesiastical career spanning over half a century.

Educated at Westminster City School, trained for the priesthood at King's College London and ordained in 1932, he began his career with a curacy at St Stephen's, Shepherd's Bush. From 1934 he served the Anglican Church in Mauritius, firstly as a missionary priest then as Archdeacon of Mauritius. Returning to England he became Vicar of Twickenham followed by a spell as Rural Dean of Hampstead before appointment to the episcopate as Bishop of Mauritius in 1959. Translated to become Bishop of Fulham (a suffragan bishop of the Diocese of London with delegated responsibility from the Bishop of London for northern and central Europe) in 1966, his final appointment was a sideways move to become Bishop of Edmonton (another suffragan bishop of that Diocese, but actually ministering there) four years later. That See was erected on 29 May 1970 in order to supervise a new district of the diocese created by the experimental area scheme that year.

In retirement he continued to serve the church as an honorary assistant bishop (in the Diocese of Peterborough and then the Kensington area of the London diocese) for a further quarter of a century.

References

 

1907 births
People educated at Westminster City School
Alumni of the Theological Department of King's College London
Anglican bishops of Mauritius
Bishops of Fulham
Bishops of Edmonton (London)
2003 deaths
Anglican missionaries in Mauritius
English Anglican missionaries
British Mauritius people